Hans Peter Pawlik (died 2 January 2012 in Vienna) was an Austrian painter and author.

Life 
As an author Pawlik wrote on his own or with Josef Otto Slezak and others multiple books and illustrated books about the history of railway in Austria. He became especially known as a painter for his historic motifs of the Southern Railway.

Works 
 Schmalspurig nach Mariazell; Slezak, Vienna 1979.
 Wiener Straßenbahn-Panorama. Bilder aus der Zeit von 1865 bis 1982; Slezak, Vienna 1982.
 Südbahn-Lokomotiven; Slezak, Vienna 1987.
 Architektur an der Semmeringbahn; in cooperation with Mihály Kubinszky and Josef Otto Slezak, 2. edition, Slezak, Vienna 1992. 
 Jenbach-Achensee; Slezak, Vienna 1993.
 Wiener Straßenbahn-Panorama. Bilder aus der Zeit von 1865 bis 1982; Slezak, Vienna 1995. 
 Wagners Werk für Wien; Slezak, Vienna 1999.
 Ring-Rund; Slezak, Vienna 1999.
 Mariazellerbahn in der Landschaft; Slezak, Vienna 2001, 2., revised edition 
 Technik der Mariazellerbahn; Slezak, Vienna 2001. 
 Unvergessene Kahlenbergbahn; Slezak, Vienna 2001. 
 Gölsdorfs Glanzstück, die 310er; Slezak, Vienna 2002.

External links 
 
 Recommended reading in the Wiener Zeitung on August 4, 2000

References 

2012 deaths
20th-century Austrian painters
Austrian male painters
21st-century Austrian painters
21st-century male artists
Austrian male writers
Year of birth missing
20th-century Austrian male artists